Joseph Jonas (1845–1921) was the German-born Lord Mayor of Sheffield.

Joseph Jonas may also refer to:

Joseph Jonas (Cincinnati) (1792–1869), Cincinnati watchmaker & silversmith
Joe Jonas (born 1989), member of Jonas Brothers, American teen rock band